The women's 100 metre butterfly event at the 1968 Olympic Games took place between 20 and 21 October. This swimming event used the butterfly stroke. Because an Olympic size swimming pool is 50 metres long, this race consisted of two lengths of the pool.

Medalists

Results

Heats
Heat 1

Heat 2

Heat 3

Heat 4

Heat 5

Semifinals
Heat 1

Heat 2

Final

References

Women's butterfly 100 metre
Women's 100 metre butterfly
1968 in women's swimming
Women's events at the 1968 Summer Olympics